The 2021–22 Bundesliga was the 59th season of the Bundesliga, Germany's premier football competition. It began on 13 August 2021 and concluded on 14 May 2022. The fixtures were announced on 25 June 2021.

Bayern Munich were the defending champions and successfully defended their title, winning their record-extending 10th consecutive title and 32nd title overall (31st in the Bundesliga era) on 23 April with three matches to spare.

Teams

A total of eighteen teams participated in the 2021–22 edition of the Bundesliga.

Team changes

Stadiums and locations

1 SC Freiburg played their first three home matches at the Dreisamstadion before permanently moving to the Europa-Park Stadion.

Personnel and kits

Managerial changes

League table

Results

Relegation play-offs
The relegation play-offs took place on 19 and 23 May 2022.

Overview

|}

Matches
All times Central European Summer Time (UTC+2)

Hertha BSC won 2–1 on aggregate, and therefore both clubs remained in their respective leagues.

Statistics

Top goalscorers

Hat-tricks

4 Player scored four goals.

Clean sheets

Number of teams by state

Awards

Monthly awards

Annual awards

Team of the season

kicker

EA Sports

Notes

References

External links

Bundesliga seasons
1
Germany